The Louisiana Coastal Protection and Restoration Authority (CPRA) is a governmental authority created by the Louisiana Legislature in the aftermath of Hurricanes Katrina and Rita. The organization takes advantage of both federal and state funding of around $1 billion annually. Since its founding, the organization has dredged over 60 miles of sediment into islands and artificial land, as well as 36,000 acres of marshland. CPRA predicts that over the next 50 years, over 1,450 square miles of land in Louisiana could be lost along coastal areas.

History 
The CPRA's forerunner, the Wetlands Conservation and Restoration Authority, was restructured as the CPRA by Act 8 of the First Extraordinary Session of 2005 when the tasks of coastal restoration and hurricane protection were consolidated under a single authority. The authority is responsible for overseeing all levee districts in the Louisiana Coastal Zone and dispersal of funding from Louisiana's Coastal Protection and Restoration Trust Fund to be used exclusively for wetland restoration and hurricane protection projects. Act 8 defines the CPRA's mandate as, "hurricane protection and the protection, conservation, restoration, and enhancement of coastal wetlands and barrier shorelines or reefs." Additionally, the act defined the term "coastal area" as the Louisiana Coastal Zone and contiguous areas that are subject to storm or tidal surge.

In April 2007, the CPRA submitted Louisiana's first ever Comprehensive Master Plan for coastal restoration and hurricane protection to the state's legislature for approval. The legislature approved the plan unanimously. Entitled: "Integrated Ecosystem Restoration and Hurricane Protection: Louisiana's Comprehensive Master Plan for a Sustainable Coast," the Master Plan represents an overarching vision that fully incorporates hurricane protection projects and structures with coastal wetland and hydrology restoration projects. U.S. Army Corps of Engineers officials will use the CPRA Master Plan as the cornerstone of the Congressionally mandated Louisiana Coastal Protection and Restoration (LaCPR) Report scheduled to be written and submitted to Congress by December 2007.

In 2012, an article in The New York Times reviewed the current state of improvements to New Orleans defenses. August 24, 2015, an article in The Huffington Post titled "10 Years After Katrina, Louisiana Is Becoming A Model For Climate Resilience" summarized the current state of Louisiana's shoreline and coastal community protection.

Plan for a Sustainable Coast 
Every five years CPRA must submit a revised plan to the state legislature. The current plan is the 2012 Master Plan, a 190-page document. The agency is currently working on the 2017 plan.

Projects detailed in the plan fall into the following categories:
 Structural Protection
 Bank Stabilization
 Oyster Barrier Reefs
 Ridge Restoration
 Shoreline Protection
 Infrastructure
 Terraces
 Barrier Island Restoration
 Marsh Creation
 Sediment Diversion
 Hydrologic Restoration

Projects
There are many projects listed on both the CPRA and CWPPRA websites, and both sites have interactive maps to readily display projects.

Current members
 Current members of the Board are listed on the agency website.

Districts
The following Levee Districts are overseen by the CPRA.
 Atchafalaya Basin Levee District
 Grand Isle Independent District
 Lafourche Basin Levee District
 North Lafouche Levee District
 Plaquemines Parish Government
 Pontchartrain Basin Levee District
 South Lafourche Levee District
 Southeast Louisiana Flood Protection Authority - East
 Southeast Louisiana Flood Protection Authority - West
 St. Mary Parish Government
 Terrebonne Levee and Conservation District

Additionally, decisions are pending on the Southwest Louisiana Parishes of Cameron, Vermillion and Iberia.

See also

America's WETLAND Foundation
Coastal Wetlands Planning, Protection and Restoration Act—CWPPRA (a federal agency)

References

External links
 Louisiana Coastal Protection and Restoration Authority (CPRA)—official website (state agency)
 The Coastal Wetlands Planning, Protection and Restoration Act (CWPPRA)—official website (federal agency)

State agencies of Louisiana
2005 establishments in Louisiana
Government agencies established in 2005